Argas africolumbae , ' is a small soft-bodied tick that is found primarily on chickens and birds including the pale crag martin.

References 

Ticks
Animals described in 1818
Parasites of birds
Argasidae